Sir Thomas Kyriell (1396–18 February 1461) was an English soldier of the Hundred Years' War and the opening of the Wars of the Roses. He was executed after the Second Battle of St Albans.

Background
The de Criol, Kyriel or Kyriell family built up a position in Kent, where they fortified Westenhanger Castle, from the middle of the 14th century.

Military career
Kyriell served under Henry V of England in Normandy, and in 1436 held the fortress at Le Crotoy in Picardy. He served under John, Lord Talbot at this period, around Rouen, and was created knight-banneret by 1443. He led the English forces in the 1450 French victory, the Battle of Formigny.

Released after being captured at Formigny, Kyriell was a Member of Parliament, representing Kent in the Parliaments of 1455-56 and 1460-61. There he showed himself a Yorkist, by his opposition to Edmund Beaufort, 2nd Duke of Somerset. He was openly a Yorkist commander by 1460, as heavy fighting began in the Wars of the Roses. Warwick the Kingmaker had Kyriell elected to the Order of the Garter on 8 February 1461, with himself and two others.

At the Second Battle of St Albans, eight days later, Kyriell was on the losing side captured while guarding the king, Henry VI of England, who was a Yorkist prisoner. Margaret of Anjou had Edward of Westminster, Prince of Wales pronounce the fate of the Yorkist guard, and they were beheaded.

Family
Kyriel married Cicely, daughter of the Somerset Member of Parliament John Stourton, whose first husband was John Hill of Spaxton.

Notes

1396 births
1461 deaths
English army officers
People from Folkestone and Hythe District
Knights of the Garter
English MPs 1455
English MPs 1461